Project: Funk da World is the debut studio album by rapper Craig Mack, released in 1994. The album was the second release on Bad Boy Records, following the Notorious B.I.G.'s Ready to Die by one week. Propelled by the success of the platinum RIAA-selling hit single "Flava in Ya Ear," the album reached gold-RIAA sales status on February 22, 1995. "Flava in Ya Ear" also featured a successful remix (not included on the album), featuring guest verses from the Notorious B.I.G., Busta Rhymes, Rampage and LL Cool J. The album's second single, "Get Down," was the rapper's second top 40 hit in 1994 and achieved gold sales status in the United States in April 1995.

Though commercially successful and acclaimed at the time of its release, the album was overshadowed by the massive success of Ready to Die, and Craig Mack quickly lost public image, releasing only one other album, the commercially unsuccessful Operation: Get Down, in 1997.

Critical reception

The Encyclopedia of Popular Music called Project: Funk da World "a laid back party record." Robert Christgau deemed the album "Biz Markie as postgangsta." Trouser Press called the album "a likable blend of non-gangsta words and unleaded modern grooves buoyed by the late-summer success of 'Flava in Ya Ear,' an upbeat anthem vague enough to suit a broad range of funk fans."

Track listing

Album singles

Charts

Weekly charts

Year-end charts

Singles chart positions

Certifications

References

1994 debut albums
Craig Mack albums
Bad Boy Records albums
Arista Records albums
Albums produced by Easy Mo Bee
Albums produced by Rashad Smith